Thomas Mason-Griffin (born September 29, 1990) is an American former basketball player. Mason-Griffin usually played as point guard. He played college basketball for the Oklahoma Sooners.

College career
After a decorated high school career in which he was named a McDonald's All-American, Mason-Griffin signed with Oklahoma. In his only season with the Sooners, he averaged 14.1 points and 5.0 assists per game, earning third-team All-Big 12 honors. He declared for the 2010 NBA draft and apologized to Oklahoma fans "if they felt I let them down”.

Professional career

Ulm (2011–2015)
He signed with the German team ratiopharm Ulm for the 2011–2012 season. Due to injuries, he missed the complete 2012–13 season. Mason-Griffin wouldn't play in the 2013–14 season as well. For the 2014–15 season, he returned to ratiopharm Ulm, and played 10 BBL games that season.

Donar (2016)
On December 15, 2015, Mason-Griffin signed with Donar Groningen in the Netherlands. On January 11, 2016, Donar and Mason-Griffin parted ways. He played one game for Donar, in which he had 8 points and 6 assists.

On October 30, 2016, Mason-Griffin was selected by the Maine Red Claws with the 108th pick of the 2016 NBA Development League draft. He was waived on November 9, before playing a game with the Red Claws.

References

1990 births
Living people
American expatriate basketball people in Germany
American expatriate basketball people in the Netherlands
Basketball players from Houston
Donar (basketball club) players
Dutch Basketball League players
McDonald's High School All-Americans
Oklahoma Sooners men's basketball players
Point guards
Ratiopharm Ulm players
Sioux Falls Skyforce players
American men's basketball players